The Tony Knowles Coastal Trail is an  trail along the coast of Anchorage, Alaska designated for non-motorized use.  The trail runs from Second Avenue in downtown Anchorage and finishes in Kincaid Park. The trail is entirely paved, supports two-way traffic, and connects with the Chester Creek Trail.  Point Woronzof Park borders the coastal trail to the east for about a mile, starting at about mile 5.0.  In the summer the trail is used extensively by walkers, runners, rollerbladers, and cyclists. In the winter, the trail is used primarily for cross country skiing and also skijoring.  The trail is a portion of the annual Tour of Anchorage cross country ski marathon. The trail's namesake is named the former Anchorage mayor and Alaska governor.

The Trail was pioneered and designed by the firm of Arctic Engineers, Inc., wholly owned and operated by Sidney E. Clark, P.E.

References

External links
 Tony Knowles Coastal Trail at Alaska.org
 Tony Knowles Coastal Trail page at RailsToTrails.us
 Bike Trails In Alaska at freespiritwear.com

Bike paths in Alaska
Geography of Anchorage, Alaska
Hiking trails in Alaska
Tourist attractions in Anchorage, Alaska
National Recreation Trails in Alaska